Municipal elections in Qatar were held for the fifth time on 13 May 2015. Five women contested the polls as candidates. Two women were elected to the Central Municipal Council (CMC) after winning their constituencies, heralding the first time two women have occupied seats in the council. This round of elections witnessed the merging of a number of depopulated constituencies and the addition of several new constituencies.

Early indications suggested that the voter turnout would be low. However, the voter turnout in various constituencies ranged from 51% to 87%, with an overall voter turnout of 70%. This was a marked increase from the 43% voter turnout in the 2011 elections. The total number of voters was 21,735. There were 109 candidates.

Background
According to government officials, 136 candidates signed up to run. Twenty-five candidates withdrew from the elections before the onset of voting, including three candidates who withdrew on 12 May. This resulted in the contention of three constituencies (1, 27, and 28) by single candidates who were declared winners by acclamation one day prior to ballots being cast. Constituency numbers 4, 9, 21, 22, 24 and 26 were contested by two candidates each. Conversely, constituency numbers 10, 11, 13, 18, 19 and 20 were vied for by six candidates apiece.

Only 5 female candidates ran for election. This invigorated discussion on the possible establishment of a quota for female candidates.

Results

References

Municipal elections in Qatar
Qatar
Municipal